Children's Commissioner is the official or unofficial title of some Children's Ombudsmen, or of the agencies they head. It could refer to:

Australia 

Children and Young People Commissioner, Australian Capital Territory
Office of the Children's Commissioner, Northern Territory, Australia
Office of the Child Safety Commissioner, Victoria, Australia
Commissioner for Children and Young People, Western Australia

United Kingdom 
Children's Commissioner for England
Scotland's Commissioner for Children and Young People
Children's Commissioner for Wales
Northern Ireland Commissioner for Children and Young People

Other countries 

Commissioner for Child Rights, Belgium (French Community)
The head (commissaris), of the Child Rights Commission, Belgium (Flemish Community))
Commissioner for Children's Rights, Cyprus
Children's Commissioner, New Zealand
Children's Rights Commissioner, Russia